Lydia Moss Bradley (July 31, 1816 – January 16, 1908) was a wealthy bank president and philanthropist notable for her philanthropic works. She founded Bradley Polytechnic Institute in Peoria, Illinois, in 1897.

Earlier life
Lydia Moss was born on July 31, 1816, in Vevay, Indiana, alongside the Ohio River. She was a daughter of Loudoun County, Virginia native Zealy Moss and a granddaughter of Revolutionary War chaplain Nathaniel Moss. Her mother was Fauquier County, Virginia native Jeanette (Glasscock) Moss.

According to her National Women's Hall of Fame biographical sketch, Lydia Moss "grew up on the frontier" and was "educated in a log home." In fact, she lived in Vevay with her family until she wed Tobias S. Bradley on May 11, 1837. At the age of 31, she and her husband then moved to Peoria, Illinois. Over the next three decades they prospered in real estate and banking. Despite her husband's death in 1867 and the prior deaths of all six of their children, Lydia Moss Bradley continued to work in business and pursued philanthropic interests, particularly in the areas of healthcare and education. Under her control, the value of the Bradley estate quadrupled.

Works

In 1875, Bradley became the first female member of a national bank board in the United States when she joined the board of directors of the First National Bank of Peoria (now part of Commerce Bank). Bradley was also one of the first American women ever to draft a marriage contract (a "prenuptial agreement" in modern terms) to protect her assets, which she filed when she married Memphis businessman Edward Clark in December 1869. The couple divorced in 1873.

Bradley gave land to the Society of St. Francis to build a hospital, now known as the OSF St. Francis Medical Center.  In 1884 she built the Bradley Home for Aged Women to care for widowed and childless women, and funded the construction of the Universalist church in Peoria. Bradley then won a U.S. Supreme Court case in 1903 over a land dispute.

She also helped to establish the first park system in Illinois. Bradley originally donated more than 30 acres of land to the City of Peoria in 1881 with instructions to create a park in memory of her longest lived daughter, Laura Bradley. The land remained unused for a decade, which prompted Bradley to offer an additional 100 acres should the city form a park district. With the approval of the Pleasure Driveway and Park District of Peoria in 1894, Bradley worked with the city to transfer the land to the park board. As part of the land agreement, Bradley stipulated that the board "shall not license or permit the sale or distribution of intoxicating drinks, or allow gambling, betting or games of chance, or boisterous conduct, or immoral or indecorous language or behavior within said park."

Bradley always considered Bradley University to be her fondest project, which she established in 1896 to honor her husband Tobias and her six children, who all died at an early age. Bradley aimed to form an institution that would provide students with a practical and useful education. Bradley Polytechnic opened its doors in October 1897. Originally organized as a four-year academy, the school became a four-year college in 1920 and a university granting graduate degrees in 1946.

Today the university enjoys the status of a fully accredited, independent institution that  provides undergraduate and graduate education in engineering, business, communication, teacher education, nursing, physical therapy, fine arts, and the liberal arts and sciences.

Death and interment
According to biographer Allen A. Upton, Lydia Moss Bradley "was confined to her home with illness" in December 1907. Initially diagnosed with internal inflammation, she briefly improved under the care of her physician, but her health then declined once again following a revised diagnosis of "la grippe" in early January 1908. Although in great pain, the now-91-year-old philanthropist reportedly remained alert and engaged with the affairs of her estate. She succumbed to complications from her condition at 7:15 a.m. on January 16, 1908. Following funeral services at her home, she was laid to rest beside her husband at the Springdale Cemetery "in the family plot that held the remains of her father, mother, Laura, the five other children and the children of William Moss."

Honors
In 1997, Bradley University honored Lydia Moss Bradley by erecting a statue on Founder's Circle in her honor. That statue has since been featured regularly in images used for university recruiting brochures. In June 2018, the statue was knocked down during a traffic accident. On August 16, 2018, there was a celebration in honor of the restored statue.

In 1998, Lydia Moss Bradley was inducted into the National Women's Hall of Fame.

See also
Bradley University

References

Further reading
 Dagit, Christal. "Lydia Moss Bradley." Illinois Heritage (Mar/Apr2015) 18#2 pp 29–31.
 Henderson,  Lyndee. More than Petticoats: Remarkable Illinois Women (2006) pp 34–43.
 Upton, Allen A. (1988). Forgotten Angel - The Story of Lydia Moss Bradley.

External links
 Lydia Moss Bradley – Biographical Sketch
 Historic Peoria's profile of Lydia Moss Bradley
 History of Bradley University 

1816 births
1908 deaths
American women philanthropists
American women's rights activists
American feminists
Bradley University people
People from Peoria, Illinois
Members of the Universalist Church of America
19th-century Christian universalists
20th-century Christian universalists
People from Vevay, Indiana
Philanthropists from Illinois
19th-century American philanthropists
Philanthropists from Indiana
Activists from Illinois
Activists from Indiana
19th-century women philanthropists